The following is a list of Lakes in Vietnam.
 Ba Mẫu Lake
 Ba Bể Lake
 Bien Ho Lake
 Bảy Mẫu Lake
 Giảng Võ Lake
 Lakes in Hanoi (Các hồ tại Hà Nội):
 Hoàn Kiếm Lake
 Núi Cốc Lake
 Phú Ninh Lake
 Thiền Quang Lake
 Trúc Bach Lake
 West Lake
 Xuan Huong Lake
 Định Bình Lake

See also

 List of lakes
 Lists of lakes

Vietnam
Lakes